1927 Országos Bajnokság I (men's water polo) was the 21st water polo championship in Hungary. There were seven teams who played one-round match for the title.

Final list 

* M: Matches W: Win D: Drawn L: Lost G+: Goals earned G-: Goals got P: Point

2. Class 

1. OTE 8, 2. BSZKRT SE 4, 3. BEAC 4 pont, Postás and VAC cancelled their participation.

Countryside 

1. MOVE Eger SE, 2. Szegedi UE, 3. Pannonia UE Sopron, 4. Tatatóvárosi AC.

Sources 
Gyarmati Dezső: Aranykor (Hérodotosz Könyvkiadó és Értékesítő Bt., Budapest, 2002.)
Sport-évkönyv 1927

1927 in water polo
1927 in Hungarian sport
Seasons in Hungarian water polo competitions